Sphaerocoryne may refer to:
 Sphaerocoryne (cnidarian), a genus of cnidarians in the family Sphaerocorynidae
 Sphaerocoryne (plant), a genus of plants in the family Annonaceae